Tito Climent (1917–1988) was an Argentine singer and film actor.

Selected filmography
 The Intruder (1939)
 Seven Women (1944)
 White Horse Inn (1948)
 Rhythm, Salt and Pepper (1951)

References

Bibliography
 Eddie Sammons. Shakespeare: A Hundred Years on Film. Scarecrow Press, 2004.

External links

1917 births
1988 deaths
Argentine male film actors
People from Buenos Aires
20th-century Argentine  male singers